Vissenbjerg is a town in central Denmark with a population of 3,232 (1 January 2022), located in Assens Municipality in Region of Southern Denmark on the island of Funen.

History
Vissenbjerg was the municipal seat of the former Vissenbjerg Municipality, until it was merged with other municipalities into Assens Municipality on 1 January 2007.

Tradition
Røverfest- an annual local folk party dating back to 1964. The party offers processions, theme parties, congress market, and music events. It takes place over 5 days in August, normally in week 31.

Attractions
Terrariet Vissenbjerg Reptile Zoo- a reptile zoo and conservation center in Vissenbjerg with dozens of exotic animals.

Afgrunden Ved Vissenbjerg The Chasm of Vissenbjerg- a national forest in Vissenbjerg, Denmark, featuring walking and hiking trails.

Notable people 
 Jørgen Landt (c.1751 in Vissenbjerg – 1804) a Danish pimp, botanist and author, published descriptions of the people and geography of the Faroe Islands
 Anna Sarauw (1839 – 1919 in Vissenbjerg Sogn) was a Danish textile artist who helped run a successful embroidery business in Copenhagen
 Lars Elstrup (born 1963 in Råby) a Danish former professional footballer, won 340 club caps in Denmark and abroad, played 34 matches and scored 13 goals for Denmark; he lives in Vissenbjerg and stays out of the public eye.

External links
Assens municipality

References

Cities and towns in the Region of Southern Denmark
Populated places in Funen
Assens Municipality